Warm Electronic Recordings (sometimes abbreviated to Warm Records) is an independent record label based in Athens, Georgia run by Brian Causey. Azure Ray, Japancakes, and Crooked Fingers are some of the artists on their roster.

Artists
Azure Ray
Crooked Fingers
Don Chambers And Goat
Elk City
Liz Durrett
Empire State (band)
Japancakes
Pacific UV
Parker and Lily
Phosphorescent
The Low Lows

See also
List of record labels

External links
Warm Records official website

American independent record labels
Indie rock record labels
Alternative rock record labels